Dubai Duty Free (DDF) is the company responsible for duty-free operations at Dubai International Airport and Al Maktoum International Airport. 

Founded in December 1983, DDF recorded first-year sales of US$20 million and has grown into one of the biggest travel retail operators in the world, with a sales turnover of US$2.02 billion in 2019. 

Sheikh Ahmed bin Saeed Al Maktoum is the president of the Dubai Civil Aviation Authority and chairman of Dubai Duty Free. and Colm McLoughlin is the executive vice-chairman and CEO. DDF is a subsidiary of the government-owned Investment Corporation of Dubai.

Foundation 
Aer Rianta, the operating company behind the world's first duty-free at Shannon Airport, was invited to present a proposal for the operations and management of a duty-free operation at Dubai International Airport. Up until this point, the airport had been served by a number of retail concessions managed by traders from Tvice-Chairmanbai. The plan was given to Sheikh Mohammed by Mohi-Din Binhendi, the director-general of Dubai Civil Aviation, and agreed with the condition that the Duty-Free be expanded to twice its original size and opened within six months.

The duty-free, at the time planned to serve three million passengers a year, was funded with an $820,000 loan from the National Bank of Dubai. One of the first challenges faced by the ten-man Aer Rianta management team (which had signed a consultancy contract with Dubai Civil Aviation) was to negotiate the transfer of the existing concessions, which resulted in Dubai Duty Free acquiring their stocks at rates preferred by the shop owners.

An advertising agency was appointed, coming up with the slogan, used to this day, 'Fly Buy Dubai'

The Duty Free opened officially on the 20th of December 1983. At the end of the Aer Rianta consultancy contract, McLoughlin was "made an offer I couldn't refuse" to stay and manage the new operation. Two of the original Aer Rianta team stayed with him.

In 1985, Sheikh Ahmed bin Saeed Al Maktoum became chairman of Emirates Airlines and the Department of Civil Aviation.

Mohammad Bin Rashid Al Maktoum has been credited as the vision behind the Dubai Duty Free, giving approval for the project to double its size and approving major concepts.

Operations 
The ongoing expansion of Dubai International Airport was mirrored by the expansion of the Duty Free operation and by 1988, 51 airlines used Dubai to service some 87 destinations, with a 4 million passenger throughput. Dubai's Duty Free earnings rose from $44,000 on its first day of trading in the month of December 1983 to $32 million in annual sales in 1986. In 1987, arrivals duty-free shop opened to the public and was earning some $200,000 a day. In 1989, the Dubai Duty Free introduced its 'Finest Surprise' promotion, a 1,000 ticket raffle to win a luxury car. The promotion has run continuously since. Passengers at the airport crossed 5 million in 1990, helping to drive a turnover of $95 million but operations were badly affected by the invasion of Kuwait by Iraq. Due to this, it took another two years to cross the $100 million mark.

The opening of the Sheikh Rashid terminal at Dubai International Airport in 2000 saw the staff count at the various Dubai Duty Free locations throughout the airport rise to 900, which came with a 5,400 M2 expansion of floor space. The turnover in 2001 rose to $222 million and in 2003, 20 years after it was established, finished off with a turnover of $380 million. The opening of Terminal 3 and Concourse 2 and 3 at Dubai International added some 17,000 M2 of retail space. It also drove the increase in warehousing and logistical space: from a small shed storing goods for sale in 1983, DDF now had 27,000 M2 of warehouse floor space and 28,000 M2 floors pace for trucking bays.

Dubai Duty Free has seen massive growth and development over the years and was named the single largest airport retailer in the world in terms of revenue, based on the years 2008–10 and 2013. The retail operation covers 38,000 square meters of retail space at the whole Dubai International Airport. Meanwhile, the Dubai Duty Free operation at Dubai World Central - Al Maktoum International Airport continues to do well and covers over 4,000 square metres. In the long term, the airport has capacity for over 160 million passengers and ultimately, the retail operation will cover some 80,000 square metres. Dubai Duty Free has won more than 700 awards around the world. 

The Dubai Duty Free employs over 6,100 staff from 47 nationalities, including 25 of its original 100 staff recruited in 1983. By 2025, it expects business to be in excess of US$3 billion a year, employing between 9,000 and 10,000 people.

The company has been named the world's largest airport retailer worldwide. By 2008, it was making per day what it had in its entire first year.  It pulled in over $2 billion in 2018, and by 2019 was reportedly responsible for 11% of the country’s revenue.

See also
 List of duty-free shops

References

External links
Official website

Retailing in Dubai
Duty-free shops
Retail companies of the United Arab Emirates
1983 establishments in the United Arab Emirates